The following is an overview of 1934 in film, including significant events, a list of films released and notable births and deaths.

Top-grossing films (U.S.)
The top ten 1934 released films by box office gross in North America are as follows:

Events
January 26 – Samuel Goldwyn (formerly of Metro-Goldwyn-Mayer) purchases the film rights to The Wonderful Wizard of Oz from the L. Frank Baum estate for $40,000.
February 19 – Bob Hope marries Dolores Reade.
April 19 – Fox Studios releases Stand Up and Cheer!, with five-year-old Shirley Temple in a relatively minor role. Shirley steals the film and Fox, which had been near bankruptcy, finds itself owning a goldmine.
May 18 – Paramount releases Little Miss Marker, with Shirley Temple, on loan from Fox, in the title role.
June 13 – An amendment to the Production Code establishes the Production Code Administration, and requires all films to obtain a certificate of approval before being released.
July 28 – Canadian-born actress Marie Dressler, best known for starring in films such as Min and Bill and Emma, dies from cancer in Santa Barbara, California at the age of 65. For her performance in Min and Bill, Dressler received the Academy Award for Best Actress.
October 12 – Fred Astaire and Ginger Rogers wham audiences again in their first joint starring roles with The Gay Divorcee grossing $1.8 million to add to the $1.5 million earned by Flying Down to Rio released at the end of 1933
 November 12 – The musical Babes in Toyland debuts, starring Stan Laurel and Oliver Hardy as comic relief.
December 11 – Fox releases the Sol M. Wurtzel production of Bright Eyes, starring their hot new property, Shirley Temple. Shirley sings "On the Good Ship Lollipop", and wins the first Academy Award ever given to a child, for her endearing portrayal of Shirley Blake.

Academy Awards

The 7th Academy Awards was held on February 27, 1935, at the Biltmore Hotel in Los Angeles. They were hosted by Irvin S. Cobb. For the first time, the Academy standardized the practice – still in effect, notwithstanding changes to the 93rd and 94th Academy Awards as a result of the COVID-19 pandemic – that the award eligibility period for a film would be the preceding calendar year.

Most nominations: One Night of Love (Columbia Pictures) – 6

Major Awards
 Best Picture: It Happened One Night – Columbia Pictures
 Best Director: Frank Capra – It Happened One Night
 Best Actor: Clark Gable – It Happened One Night
 Best Actress: Claudette Colbert – It Happened One Night

Most Awards: It Happened One Night – 5

It Happened One Night became the first film to perform a "clean sweep" of the top five award categories: Best Picture, Best Director, Best Actor, Best Actress, and Best Screenplay. This feat would later be duplicated by One Flew Over the Cuckoo's Nest in 1976 and The Silence of the Lambs in 1992. It also was the first romantic comedy to be named Best Picture.

1934 film releases

United States unless stated

January–March
January 1934
6 January
The Big Shakedown
19 January
Frontier Marshal
22 January
The Lucky Texan
26 January
Four Frightened People
You Can't Buy Everything
Unknown
Colonel Blood
February 1934
1 February
All of Me
2 February
Carolina
3 February
Dark Hazard
I've Got Your Number
9 February
Les Misérables (France)
The Rise of Catherine the Great (GB)
Six of a Kind
The Tars (Netherlands)
10 February
Mandalay
14 February
Fashions of 1934
16 February
The Cat and the Fiddle
The Lost Patrol
22 February
It Happened One Night
23 February
Bolero
Death Takes a Holiday
25 February
Managed Money
March 1934
3 March
David Harum
17 March
Jimmy the Gent
30 March
Riptide
Spitfire
31 March
Gambling Lady
Wonder Bar

April–June
April 1934
5 April
You're Telling Me!
7 April
The House of Rothschild
9 April
Glamour
10 April
Viva Villa!
Whirlpool
15 April
City Limits
16 April
Tarzan and His Mate
26 April
We're Not Dressing
27 April
Liliom
May 1934
1 May
The Last Round-Up
Little Man, What Now?
2 May
Le Grand Jeu
3 May
Twentieth Century
4 May
Manhattan Melodrama
Stand Up and Cheer!
9 May
Sadie McKee
15 May
The Man from Utah
18 May
The Black Cat
Born to Be Bad
Thirty-Day Princess
25 May
The Thin Man
26 May
Twenty Million Sweethearts
31 May
The Key
June 1934
1 June
Little Miss Marker
2 June
Fog Over Frisco
Operator 13
4 June
Red Ensign
6 June
Are We Civilized?
8 June
Now I'll Tell
13 June
The Circus Clown
28 June
Of Human Bondage
The World Moves On
30 June
Baby Take a Bow

July–September
July 1934
6 July
Charlie Chan's Courage
13 July
Kiss and Make-Up
The Old Fashioned Way
We're Rich Again
20 July
Grand Canary
Here Comes the Navy
30 July
The Cat's-Paw
August 1934
3 August
The Girl from Missouri
4 August
The Man with Two Faces
6 August
One More River
13 August
Everybody's Woman (Italy)
15 August
Bulldog Drummond Strikes Back
Jane Eyre
16 August
Dames
17 August
Treasure Island
19 August
The Count of Monte Cristo
23 August
Unfinished Symphony
24 August
Hide-Out
30 August
Crime Without Passion
31 August
Chained
Now and Forever
Peck's Bad Boy
She Loves Me Not
September 1934
5 September
One Night of Love
11 September
Maniac
12 September
L'Atalante (France)
Charlie Chan in London
14 September
The Barretts of Wimpole Street
Death on the Diamond
15 September
The Scarlet Empress
17 September
Young and Beautiful
19 September
A Lost Lady
21 September
Belle of the Nineties
The Richest Girl in the World
22 September
The Case of the Howling Dog
28 September
Judge Priest
The Pursuit of Happiness

October–December
October 1934
1 October
She Had to Choose
2 October
Our Daily Bread
4 October
Jew Süss
5 October
Cleopatra
8 October
The Return of Bulldog Drummond
13 October
Madame Du Barry
18 October
Man of Aran (GB)
19 October
Forbidden Territory
The Gay Divorcee
What Every Woman Knows
22 October
The Captain Hates the Sea
Great Expectations
The Trail Beyond
November 1934
2 November
The Merry Widow(France/US)
3 November
Gambling
9 November
Evelyn Prentice
10 November
Kid Millions
The St. Louis Kid
16 November
The White Parade
17 November
Girl o' My Dreams
It's a Gift
23 November
Anne of Green Gables
The Painted Veil
26 November
Imitation of Life
29 November
Road House(GB)
30 November
Babes in Toyland
Broadway Bill
The Iron Duke 
The Private Life of Don Juan (GB)
December 1934
7 December
A Wicked Woman
9 December
Lieutenant Kijé
10 December
Something Always Happens (GB)
11 December
Limehouse Blues
Le Roi des Champs-Élysées (France)
14 December
The Dream Car
The Gay Bride
21 December
The Silver Streak
23 December
Forsaking All Others
The Mighty Barnum
The Scarlet Pimpernel (GB)
28 December
Bright Eyes
Here is My Heart
The Little Minister
31 December
Evergreen (GB)

Notable films released in 1934
United States unless stated

0-9

1860 – (Italy)

A
All of Me, starring Miriam Hopkins and Fredric March
Amok, directed by Fedor Ozep – (France)
Angèle, directed by Marcel Pagnol, starring Fernandel – (France)
Anne of Green Gables, starring Anne Shirley
Are We Civilized?, starring William Farnum
L'Atalante, directed by Jean Vigo, starring Michel Simon – (France)

B
Babes in Toyland, starring Laurel and Hardy
Baby, Take a Bow, starring Shirley Temple
The Barretts of Wimpole Street, starring Norma Shearer, Fredric March and Charles Laughton
The Battle, starring Merle Oberon, Charles Boyer and John Loder – (GB/France)
Belle of the Nineties, starring Mae West and Johnny Mack Brown
The Big Road (Dalu), directed by Sun Yu – (China)
The Big Shakedown, starring Bette Davis and Charles Farrell
The Black Cat, starring Boris Karloff and Bela Lugosi
Bolero, starring George Raft and Carole Lombard
Boots! Boots!, starring George Formby – (GB – first film by Blakeley's Productions)
Born to Be Bad, starring Cary Grant, Loretta Young, Jackie Kelk
Bright Eyes, starring Shirley Temple
Broadway Bill, directed by Frank Capra, starring Warner Baxter and Myrna Loy
Bulldog Drummond Strikes Back, starring Ronald Colman

C
The Captain Hates the Sea, starring Victor McLaglen and John Gilbert in his last film role
Carolina, starring Janet Gaynor and Lionel Barrymore
The Case of the Howling Dog, starring Warren William (as Perry Mason)
The Cat and the Fiddle, starring Ramón Novarro and Jeanette MacDonald
The Cat's-Paw, starring Harold Lloyd
Chained, starring Joan Crawford and Clark Gable
Chapayev – winner of National Board of Review "Best Foreign Film" Award in 1935 – (U.S.S.R.)
Charlie Chan in London, starring Warner Oland and Ray Milland
Charlie Chan's Courage,  starring Warner Oland
The Circus Clown, starring Joe E. Brown
City Limits
Cleopatra, directed by Cecil B. DeMille, starring Claudette Colbert and Warren William
Colonel Blood, starring Frank Cellier
The Count of Monte Cristo, starring Robert Donat
Crime Without Passion, starring Claude Rains

D
Dames, choreographed by Busby Berkeley, starring Joan Blondell, Dick Powell and Ruby Keeler
David Harum starring Will Rogers
Dark Hazard, starring Edward G. Robinson
Death on the Diamond, starring Robert Young
Death Takes a Holiday, starring Fredric March
The Dream Car (Meseautó), directed by Béla Gaál and starring Zita Perczel, Ella Gombaszögi and Klári Tolnay – (Hungary)
Don't Make Grandpa Angry (Nezlobte dědečka), directed by Karel Lamač, starring Vlasta Burian, Čeněk Šlégl and Adina Mandlová – (Czechoslovakia)

E
Evelyn Prentice, starring William Powell and Myrna Loy
Evergreen, directed by Victor Saville, starring Jessie Matthews – (GB)
Everybody's Woman (La signora di tutti), directed by Max Ophüls, starring Isa Miranda – (Italy)

F
Fashions of 1934, starring William Powell and Bette Davis
Ferdowsi, starring Abdolhossein Sepanta and Ardeshir Irani (Iran)
Frontier Marshal, starring George O' Brien 
Fog Over Frisco, starring Bette Davis
Forbidden Territory, starring Gregory Ratoff, Ronald Squire, Binnie Barnes – (GB)
Forsaking All Others, starring Joan Crawford, Clark Gable and Robert Montgomery

G
Gambling, starring George M. Cohan
Gambling Lady, starring Barbara Stanwyck
The Gay Bride, starring Carole Lombard
The Gay Divorcee, starring Fred Astaire and Ginger Rogers
The Girl from Missouri, starring Jean Harlow
Girl o' My Dreams, starring Mary Carlisle, Edward J. Nugent, Lon Chaney Jr., Sterling Holloway
Glamour, starring Paul Lukas
The Goddess (Shen nu) – (China)
Grand Canary, starring Warner Baxter
Le Grand Jeu (The Great Game), directed by Jacques Feyder – (France)
Great Expectations, starring Henry Hull and Jane Wyatt

H
Here Comes the Navy, starring James Cagney and Pat O'Brien
Here is My Heart, starring Bing Crosby and Kitty Carlisle
Hide-Out, starring Robert Montgomery and Margaret Sullavan
Hollywood Party, starring Stan Laurel, Oliver Hardy, Jimmy Durante and Lupe Vélez
The House of Rothschild, starring George Arliss and Loretta Young

I
I've Got Your Number, starring Joan Blondell and Pat O'Brien
Imitation of Life, starring Claudette Colbert and Warren William
The Iron Duke, starring George Arliss
It Happened One Night, directed by Frank Capra, starring Clark Gable and Claudette Colbert – winner of 5 Academy Awards
It's a Gift, starring W. C. Fields

J
Jane Eyre, starring Virginia Bruce and Colin Clive
Jew Suss, starring Conrad Veidt 
Jimmy the Gent, starring James Cagney and Bette Davis
Jolly Fellows (Vesyolye rebyata) – the first Russian musical
Juárez y Maximiliano (Juarez and Maximilian) – (Mexico)
Judge Priest, starring Will Rogers

K
The Key, starring William Powell and Edna Best
Kid Millions, starring Eddie Cantor
Kiss and Make-Up, starring Cary Grant, Helen Mack

L
The Lady Is Willing, starring Leslie Howard and Cedric Hardwicke – (GB)
The Last Round-Up, starring Randolph Scott
Lieutenant Kijé – (U.S.S.R.)
Liliom, directed by Fritz Lang, starring Charles Boyer – (France)
Limehouse Blues, starring George Raft and Jean Parker
Little Man, What Now?, starring Margaret Sullavan and Douglass Montgomery
The Little Minister, starring Katharine Hepburn and John Beal
Little Miss Marker, starring Shirley Temple
A Lost Lady, starring Barbara Stanwyck
The Lost Patrol, starring Victor McLaglen, Boris Karloff and Wallace Ford
The Lucky Texan, starring John Wayne

M-N
Madame Du Barry, starring Dolores del Río
The Man from Utah, starring John Wayne
Man of Aran (documentary), directed by Robert Flaherty – (GB)
The Man Who Knew Too Much, directed by Alfred Hitchcock, starring Leslie Banks, Edna Best and Peter Lorre – (GB)
The Man with Two Faces, starring Edward G. Robinson
Managed Money, starring Shirley Temple
Mandalay, starring Kay Francis
Manhattan Melodrama, starring Clark Gable, William Powell and Myrna Loy
Maniac, starring Horace B. Carpenter
Mauvaise Graine, directed by Billy Wilder – (FR)
The Merry Widow (La veuve joyeuse), directed by Ernst Lubitsch, starring Maurice Chevalier and Jeanette MacDonald – (France/US)
Les Misérables, directed by Raymond Bernard, starring Harry Baur and Charles Vanel – (France)
The Mighty Barnum, starring Wallace Beery 
Murder at Monte Carlo, starring Errol Flynn – (GB)
Now and Forever, starring Gary Cooper and Carole Lombard
Now I'll Tell, starring Spencer Tracy

O
Of Human Bondage, starring Leslie Howard and Bette Davis
The Old Curiosity Shop, directed by Thomas Bentley – (GB)
The Old Fashioned Way, starring W. C. Fields
One More River, directed by James Whale
One Night of Love, starring Grace Moore
Operator 13, starring Marion Davies and Gary Cooper
Our Daily Bread, directed by King Vidor, starring Karen Morley and Tom Keene

P
The Painted Veil, starring Greta Garbo and Herbert Marshall
Pardon My Pups, a Shirley Temple short
Peck's Bad Boy, directed by Edward F. Cline, starring Jackie Cooper
Plunder of Peach and Plum (Taoli Jie) – (China)
The Private Life of Don Juan, directed by Alexander Korda, starring Douglas Fairbanks and Merle Oberon – (GB)
The Pursuit of Happiness, directed by Alexander Hall

R
Radio Parade of 1935, starring Will Hay – (GB)
Red Ensign, starring Leslie Banks – (GB)
The Return of Bulldog Drummond, starring Ralph Richardson and Ann Todd – (GB)
The Richest Girl in the World, starring Miriam Hopkins, Joel McCrea and Fay Wray
Riptide, starring Norma Shearer and Robert Montgomery
The Rise of Catherine the Great, starring Elisabeth Bergner and Douglas Fairbanks, Jr. – (GB)
Road House, directed by Maurice Elvey, starring Violet Loraine and Gordon Harker (GB) 
Le Roi des Champs-Élysées (The King of the Champs-Élysées), starring Buster Keaton – (France)

S
Sadie McKee, starring Joan Crawford
The Scarlet Empress, directed by Josef von Sternberg, starring Marlene Dietrich and John Lodge
The Scarlet Pimpernel, starring Leslie Howard and Merle Oberon – (GB)
Servants' Entrance, starring Janet Gaynor 
She Loves Me Not, starring Miriam Hopkins and Bing Crosby
Shirin and Farhad, starring Roohangiz Saminejad (Iran)
The Silver Streak, starring Charles Starrett
Sing as We Go, starring Gracie Fields and Stanley Holloway – (GB)
Six of a Kind, starring Charles Ruggles, Mary Boland and W. C. Fields
Something Always Happens, directed by Michael Powell, starring, Ian Hunter, Nance O'Neil, Peter Gawthorne, Muriel George – (GB)
 The Song of Ceylon, documentary directed by Basil Wright – (GB)
Song of the Fishermen (Yu guang qu) – (China)
Spitfire, starring Katharine Hepburn
The St. Louis Kid, starring James Cagney
Stand Up and Cheer!, starring Warner Baxter and Madge Evans, featuring 5-year-old Shirley Temple
A Story of Floating Weeds (Ukikusa monogatari), directed by Yasujirō Ozu – (Japan)

T
The Tars – (Netherlands)
Tarzan and His Mate, starring Johnny Weissmuller and Maureen O'Sullivan
The Thin Man, directed by W. S. Van Dyke, starring William Powell and Myrna Loy
Thirty-Day Princess, starring Sylvia Sidney and Cary Grant
Those Were the Days, directed by Thomas Bentley, starring Will Hay and John Mills – (GB)
The Trail Beyond, starring John Wayne
Treasure Island, starring Wallace Beery and Jackie Cooper
Twentieth Century, directed by Howard Hawks, starring John Barrymore and Carole Lombard
Twenty Million Sweethearts, starring Pat O'Brien, Dick Powell and Ginger Rogers

U-V
Unfinished Symphony, directed by Anthony Asquith (GB/Austria)
Viva Villa!, starring Wallace Beery, Leo Carrillo and Fay Wray

W
Waltzes from Vienna, directed by Alfred Hitchcock, starring Esmond Knight and Jessie Matthews – (GB)
We're Not Dressing, starring Bing Crosby and Carole Lombard
We're Rich Again, starring Edna May Oliver and Billie Burke
What Every Woman Knows, starring Helen Hayes
Whirlpool, starring Jack Holt and Jean Arthur
The White Parade, starring Loretta Young
A Wicked Woman, starring Mady Christians, Jean Parker and Charles Bickford
The Woman of the Port (La Mujer del Puerto) – (Mexico)
Wonder Bar, starring Al Jolson
Workers, Let's Go (Hej rup!), directed by Martin Frič – (Czechoslovakia)

Y-Z
You Can't Buy Everything, starring May Robson and Jean Parker
You're Telling Me!, starring W. C. Fields
Young and Beautiful
Zouzou, directed by Marc Allégret, starring Jean Gabin and Josephine Baker – (France)

Serials
Burn 'Em Up Barnes (released June 16) (12-chapter Mascot Pictures action), starring Frankie Darro and (as Barnes) Jack Mulhall
Mystery Mountain (released December 3) (12-chapter Mascot Pictures western), starring Ken Maynard
The Lost Jungle
The Law of the Wild, starring Rin Tin Tin
Pirate Treasure
The Red Rider (released July 16) (15-chapter Universal Pictures western), starring Buck Jones
Tailspin Tommy (released October 29) (12-chapter Universal Pictures action), starring Maurice Murphy
The Vanishing Shadow
Young Eagles

Comedy film series and shorts

Harold Lloyd (1913–1938) 
The Cat's-Paw
Lupino Lane (1915–1939)
My Old Duchess (directed by)
Buster Keaton (1917–1944)
The Gold Ghost (short, directed by)
Allez Oop (short, directed by)
Le Roi des Champs-Élysées (feature)
Laurel and Hardy (1921–1945)
Oliver the Eighth (short)
Hollywood Party (feature)
Going Bye-Bye! (short)
Them Thar Hills (short)
Babes in Toyland (feature)
The Live Ghost (short)
Our Gang (1922–1944)
Hi'-Neighbor!
For Pete's Sake!
The First Round-Up
Honky Donkey
Mike Fright
Washee Ironee
Harry Langdon (1924–1936)
Circus Hoodoo (short)
Petting Preferred (short)
Counsel on De Fence (short) as Darrow Langdon
Shivers (short) as Ichabod Somerset Crop
Wheeler & Woolsey (1929–1937)
Hips, Hips, Hooray! 
Cockeyed Cavaliers 
Kentucky Kernels
Ted Healy and His Stooges (1933–1934)
The Three Stooges (1934–1959)
Woman Haters (May 5)
Punch Drunks (July 13)
Men in Black (September 28) AAN
Screen Snapshots Series 14 #1 (September 29)
Screen Snapshots Series 14 #2 (October 26)
The Captain Hates the Sea (November 28) §
Three Little Pigskins (December 8)

Animated short film series

Krazy Kat (1925–1940)
The Autograph Hunter
Southern Exposure
Tom Thumb
Cinder Alley
Bowery Daze
Busy Bus
Masquerade Party
The Trapeze Artist
The Katnips of 1940
Krazy's Waterloo
Goofy Gondolas

Oswald the Lucky Rabbit (1927–1938)
Chicken Reel
The Candy House
The County Fair
The Toy Shoppe
Kings Up
Wolf! Wolf!
The Ginger Bread Boy
Goldielocks and the Three Bears
Annie Moved Away
Wax Works
William Tell
Chris Columbus, Jr.
The Dizzy Dwarf
Ye Happy Pilgrims
Sky Larks
Spring in the Park
Mickey Mouse (1928–1953)
Shanghaied
Camping Out – known as "Camping Troubles" in releases outside the United States.
Playful Pluto 
Gulliver Mickey
Hollywood Party (guest appearance)
Mickey's Steam Roller – First appearance of Mickey's nephews.
Orphan's Benefit – First time Donald Duck from The Wise Little Hen appears in a Mickey cartoon. First appearance of Clara Cluck. Last black and white appearance of Clarabelle Cow and Horace Horsecollar. First cartoon were Mickey wears a shirt.
Mickey Plays Papa
The Dognapper 
Babes in Toyland (guest appearance in live action; costumed character)
Two-Gun Mickey – Last black and white appearance of Minnie Mouse.
Silly Symphonies (1929–1939)
 The China Shop
 The Grasshopper and the Ants
 Funny Little Bunnies
 The Big Bad Wolf
 The Wise Little Hen
 The Flying Mouse
 Peculiar Penguins
 The Goddess of Spring
Screen Songs (1929–1938)
Keeps Rainin' All the Time
Let's All Sing Like the Birdies Sing
Tune Up and Sing
Lazy Bones
This Little Piggie Went to Market
She Reminds Me of You
Love Thy Neighbor
Let's Sing with Popeye
Looney Tunes and Merrie Melodies (1930–1969)
Buddy the Gob
Pettin' in the Park
Honeymoon Hotel
Buddy and Towser
Buddy's Garage
Beauty and the Beast
Those Were Wonderful Days
Buddy's Trolley Troubles
Goin' to Heaven on a Mule
Buddy of the Apes
How Do I Know It's Sunday
Buddy's Bearcats
Why Do I Dream Those Dreams
The Girl at the Ironing Board
The Miller's Daughter
Shake Your Powder Puff
Buddy the Detective
Rhythm in the Bow
Buddy the Woodsman
Buddy's Circus
Those Beautiful Dames
Buddy's Adventures
Pop Goes Your Heart
Viva Buddy
Buddy the Dentist
Terrytoons (1930–1964)
Scrappy (1931–1941)
Betty Boop (1932–1939)
 She Wronged Him Right
 Red Hot Mamma
 Ha! Ha! Ha!
 Betty in Blunderland
 Betty Boop's Rise to Fame
 Betty Boop's Trial
 Betty Boop's Lifeguard
 Poor Cinderella (first and only Betty Boop cartoon in colour)
 There's Something About a Soldier
 Betty Boop's Little Pal
 Betty Boop's Prize Show
 Keep in Style
 When My Ship Comes In
Popeye the Sailor (1933–1957)
Willie Whopper (1933-1934)
ComiColor Cartoons (1933–1936)
Cubby Bear (1933-1934)
The Little King (1933-1934)
Happy Harmonies (1934–1938)
Cartune Classics (1934–1935)
Color Rhapsodies (1934–1949)
Amos 'n' Andy (1934)

Births
January 6 – Sylvia Syms, English actress (d. 2023)
January 8 – Roy Kinnear, British character actor (d. 1988)
January 11 – Mitchell Ryan, American actor (d. 2022)
January 14 – Richard Briers, English actor (d. 2013)
January 20 – Tom Baker, British actor
January 21 – Audrey Dalton, Irish actress
January 22 – Bill Bixby, American actor (d. 1993)
January 23 – Carmine Caridi, American actor (d. 2019)
February 11 – Tina Louise, American actress
February 12
Annette Crosbie, Scottish actor
Valerio Ruggeri, Italian actor and voice actor (d. 2015)
February 13 – George Segal, American actor and musician (d. 2021)
February 17
Alan Bates, English actor (d. 2003)
Barry Humphries, Australian comedian, actor, satirist, artist and author
February 21 – Rue McClanahan, American actress (d. 2010)
March 4 - Anne Haney, American actress (d. 2001)
March 5
James Sikking, American former actor
Nicholas Smith, English comedy actor (d. 2015)
March 9
Del Close, American actor, writer and teacher (d. 1999)
Joyce Van Patten, American actress
March 22 – May Britt, Swedish actress
March 26 – Alan Arkin, American actor
March 27 – Peter Schamoni, German director (d. 2011)
March 31
Richard Chamberlain, American actor and singer
Shirley Jones, American singer and actress
April 2 - Shirley Douglas, Canadian actress (d. 2020)
April 7 - Ian Richardson, Scottish actor (d. 2007)
April 14 - Josef Somr, Czech actor (d. 2022)
April 16 - Robert Stigwood, Australian-born British producer (d. 2016)
April 24 – Shirley MacLaine, American actress
April 25 - Denny Miller, American actor (d. 2014)
May 1 - John Meillon, Australian character actor (d. 1989)
May 3 – Ivan Andonov, Bulgarian film director (d. 2011)
May 11 - André Gregory, French-born American director, writer and actor
May 18 - Dwayne Hickman, American actor, producer and director (d. 2022)
May 22 - Fred Roos, American film producer
May 24 – Kiril Gospodinov, Bulgarian actor (d. 2003)
May 29 – Marina Cicogna, Italian producer
June 1
Pat Boone, American singer and actor
Peter Masterson, American actor, director, producer and writer (d. 2018)
June 8 - Millicent Martin, English actress, singer and comedian
June 15 - William Newman (actor), American actor (d. 2015)
June 16
Eileen Atkins, British actress
Bill Cobbs, American actor
Jane Henson, American puppeteer (d. 2013)
June 21
Terrence Evans, American actor (d. 2015)
Maro Kontou, Greek actress and politician
June 26 - Josef Sommer, retired German-American actor
July 1 
Jamie Farr, American actor
Jean Marsh, English actress (Upstairs, Downstairs)
Ester Pajusoo, Estonian actress 
July 5 – Nikolay Binev, Bulgarian actor (d. 2003)
July 8 – Marty Feldman, English comedian and actor (d. 1982)
July 10 - Jerry Nelson, American puppeteer (d. 2012)
July 15 – Eva Krížiková, Slovak actress (d. 2020)
July 22
Eric del Castillo, Mexican actor
Louise Fletcher, American actress (d. 2022)
July 26 - Ken Pogue, Canadian actor (d. 2015)
July 29 – Sergio Fiorentini, Italian actor and voice actor (d. 2014)
August 5 - Zakes Mokae, South African-American actor (d. 2009)
August 7 – Marija Kohn, Croatian actress (d. 2018)
August 14 - Vernon Dobtcheff, British actor
August 24 – Kenny Baker, English-born actor (d. 2016)
August 30 – Helen Craig, English children's author and illustrator (Angelina Ballerina)
September 11 – Ian Abercrombie, English-American actor and comedian (d. 2012)
September 20
Sophia Loren, Italian actress
Karen Sharpe, American actress
September 27 - Claude Jarman Jr., American former child actor
September 28 – Brigitte Bardot, French actress
September 29 - Alan Hopgood, Australian actor (d. 2022)
October 13 - Savely Kramarov, Russian-American actor
October 15 - Peter Haskell, American actor (d. 2010)
October 19 – Glória Menezes, Brazilian actress 
October 20 – Timothy West, English actor
November 5 – Kira Muratova, Russian director (d. 2018)
November 10  
Richard Bradford, American actor (d. 2016)
Joanna Moore, American actress (d. 1997)       
November 11
Suzanne Lloyd, Canadian actress
Nadine Trintignant, French director, producer and screenwriter
November 13 – Garry Marshall, American director, actor, producer, writer and voice artist (d. 2016)
November 15 - Joanna Barnes, American actress (d. 2022)
November 21
Jack Kehoe, American actor (d. 2020)
Laurence Luckinbill, American actor, playwright and director
November 23 - Michael Wayne, American producer and actor (d. 2003)
November 25 - Ann Davies (actress), English actress (d. 2022)
November 28 – Jaakko Pakkasvirta, Finnish film director and screenwriter (d. 2018)
December 9 – Judi Dench, English actress
December 16 - Pete Schrum, American actor (d. 2003)
December 26 - Matt Zimmerman (actor), Canadian actor (d. 2022)
December 28 – Maggie Smith, English actress
December 29 – Forugh Farrokhzad, Iranian poet and film director (d. 1967)
December 30 – Russ Tamblyn, American actor

Deaths
 March 21 – Lilyan Tashman, 34, American actress (cancer)
 May 31 – Lew Cody, 50, American actor
 June 8 – Dorothy Dell, 19, American actress (road accident)
 July 6 – Harry A. Pollard, 55, American actor & director
 July 28 – Marie Dressler, 65, Canadian-born American Academy Award winning actress (cancer)

Debuts
Gene Autry – In Old Santa Fe
Donald Duck – The Wise Little Hen
Alice Faye – George White's Scandals
Alec Guinness – Evensong
Rita Hayworth – Cruz Diablo
Bob Hope – Going Spanish
Margaret Lockwood – Lorna Doone
Keye Luke – The Painted Veil
Ann Miller – Anne of Green Gables
Anne Revere – Double Door
Rosalind Russell – Evelyn Prentice
Ann Rutherford – Student Tour
George Sanders – Love, Life and Laughter
Ann Sheridan – Search for Beauty
James Stewart – Art Trouble
Robert Taylor – Handy Andy

References

 
Film by year